David Smith is a Canadian politician, who was elected to the Legislative Assembly of Ontario in the 2022 provincial election. He represents the riding of Scarborough Centre as a member of the Progressive Conservative Party of Ontario.

Smith is a trustee with the Toronto District School Board.

References 

Living people
People from Scarborough, Toronto
Politicians from Toronto
Progressive Conservative Party of Ontario MPPs
Toronto District School Board trustees
Black Canadian politicians
21st-century Canadian politicians
Year of birth missing (living people)